An abolla was a cloak-like garment worn by ancient Greeks and Romans. Nonius Marcellus quotes a passage of Varro to show that it was a garment worn by soldiers (vestis militaris), and thus opposed to the toga. Roman women also wore a version of the abolla by at least the Imperial Period.

The abolla was, however, not confined to military occasions, but was also worn in the city. It was especially used by the Stoic philosophers at Rome as the pallium philosophicum, just as the Greek philosophers were accustomed to distinguish themselves by a particular dress. Hence, the expression of Juvenal facinus majoris abollae merely signifies, "a crime committed by a very deep philosopher".

The term abolla is actually a  Latinization of the Greek ambolla or anabole, for a loose woolen cloak.

See also
Pallium
Paenula
Clothing in ancient Rome

References

Other sources
The Wordsworth Dictionary of Phrase and Fable

External links
Abolla (article in Smith's Dictionary of Greek and Roman Antiquities)

Military uniforms
Academic dress
Robes and cloaks
Roman-era clothing
Greek clothing